Lepidodactylus tepukapili is a species of gecko, which is known as the Tuvalu forest gecko and is known in the Tuvaluan language as moko or pili. It is the only recorded vertebrate that is endemic to Tuvalu. It has been located on Fuagea (also called Fuakea) and on Tepuka.

Lepidodactylus tepukapili's naming is based upon the Tuvaluan language words for "small lizard" and the island of Tepuka, where specimens were first discovered.

In 2021, the IUCN published its assessment of the Tuvalu forest gecko, classifying it as Critically Endangered due to the ongoing threat of sea-level rise, as related to anthropogenic climate change. The two small low-lying islands on which it occurs average just 2 metres above sea level.   IUCN Red List.

References

Lepidodactylus
Endemic fauna of Tuvalu
Reptiles of Oceania
Reptiles described in 2003